Gauge factor (GF) or strain factor of a strain gauge is the ratio of relative change in electrical resistance R, to the mechanical strain ε. The gauge factor is defined as:

 

where
 ε = strain = 
 = absolute change in length
  = original length
 ν = Poisson's ratio
 ρ = resistivity
 ΔR = change in strain gauge resistance due axial strain and lateral strain
 R  = unstrained resistance of strain gauge

Piezoresistive effect
It is a common misconception that the change in resistance of a strain gauge is based solely, or most heavily, on the geometric terms. This is true for some materials, and the gauge factor is simply:

However, most commercial strain gauges utilise resistors made from materials that demonstrate a strong piezoresistive effect. The resistivity of these materials changes with strain, accounting for the  term of the defining equation above. In constantan strain gauges (the most commercially popular), the effect accounts for 20% of the gauge factor, but in silicon gauges, the contribution of the piezoresistive term is much larger than the geometric terms. This can be seen in the general examples of strain gauges below:

Effect of temperature

The definition of the gauge factor does not rely on temperature, however the gauge factor only relates resistance to strain if there are no temperature effects. In practice, where changes in temperature or temperature gradients exist, the equation to derive resistance will have a temperature term. The total effect is:

where
 α = temperature coefficient 
 θ = temperature change

References

Equations